Jaylin Chad Lindsey (born March 27, 2000) is an American professional soccer player who plays as a right-back for Major League Soccer club Charlotte FC.

Career
Born in Charlotte, North Carolina, Lindsey joined the Sporting Kansas City academy setup in January 2015. Lindsey spent the 2015–16 academy season alternating between Sporting Kansas City's under-18 and under-16 sides. In 2016, Lindsey started to train with Sporting Kansas City's first-team as well as their United Soccer League affiliate, Swope Park Rangers. He spent time with the Rangers during their two-week pre-season camp in Tucson, Arizona, playing 68 minutes in a scrimmage match against the Tulsa Golden Hurricane.

On May 6, 2016, it was announced that Lindsey had signed an academy contract with Swope Park Rangers, meaning that he could play in USL matches for the side without losing his NCAA eligibility. Two days later, on May 8, Lindsey made his professional debut for the club in the league against Saint Louis FC. He came on as an 85th-minute substitute for Ualefi as Swope Park Rangers lost 3–0. In making his debut for Swope Park, Lindsey became the first American soccer player born in the year 2000 and beyond to make a professional appearance in a competitive match.

In 2017, Lindsey spent time in the Sporting Kansas City academy and with the United States under-17 side, before signing a Homegrown Player contract with Sporting Kansas City on September 15, 2017 ahead of the 2018 season. He attended Blue Valley West High School and graduated in 2018.

Lindsey made his Sporting Kansas City debut as a substitute in a 4–1 victory over Minnesota United FC at Children's Mercy Park on June 3, 2018, before earning his first start three days later in a 2–0 win against Real Salt Lake at Rio Tinto Stadium in the Lamar Hunt U.S. Open Cup Fourth Round. Lindsey recorded his first professional assist when he helped set up Johnny Russell's goal in a 3–2 loss to the New York Red Bulls at Red Bull Arena on July 14, 2018.

On December 12, 2021, Lindsey was traded to Charlotte FC in exchange for an initial $100,000 in allocation money, which could rise to as much as $325,000.

International
Lindsey has represented the United States at the under-14, under-15, and under-17 level.

Career statistics

Club

Honors
United States U20
CONCACAF U-20 Championship: 2018

References

External links 
 
 

2000 births
Living people
African-American soccer players
Sporting Kansas City II players
Sporting Kansas City players
Charlotte FC players
Association football defenders
Soccer players from Charlotte, North Carolina
USL Championship players
United States men's youth international soccer players
American soccer players
Major League Soccer players
United States men's under-20 international soccer players
Homegrown Players (MLS)
21st-century African-American sportspeople
20th-century African-American sportspeople